Microsoft Lumia 550 is a budget smartphone manufactured by Microsoft Mobile as part of its Lumia family of Windows-based mobile computing products. It was introduced along with the Lumia 950 and the Lumia 950 XL on 6 October 2015 at a press event held in New York City.

The Lumia 550 was released in December 2015 with Windows 10 Mobile version 1511. Windows 10 Mobile version 1607, Anniversary Update was released in August 2016. Windows 10 Mobile version 1709, Fall Creators Update, was the final software update.

Specifications

Hardware 

The Lumia 550 has a 4.7-inch IPS LCD display, quad-core 1.1 GHz Cortex-A7 Qualcomm Snapdragon 210 processor, 1 GB of RAM and 8 GB of internal storage that can be expanded using microSD cards up to 256 GB. The phone has a 2100 mAh Li-Ion battery, 5 MP rear camera and 2 MP front-facing camera. It is available in black and white.

Software 

The Lumia 550 ships with Windows 10 Mobile.

Reception 

Michael Allison of MSPoweruser criticized the Lumia 550 for having lower specs than its predecessor, such as an inferior 5 MP camera that lacks a wide angle lens, missing functionality and a shorter battery life, making it uncompetitive with similar phones in its price range.

Sean Cameron of Techradar gave the Lumia 550 3 stars out of 5, praising its screen, camera and speakers, but criticizing the battery life and performance and calling the Windows 10 Mobile operating system "unfinished".

References

External links 
 

Windows 10 Mobile devices
Mobile phones introduced in 2015
Discontinued smartphones
550
Microsoft hardware
Mobile phones with user-replaceable battery